"" (From my heart I hold you dear, o Lord) is a Lutheran hymn in German by the Protestant theologian and reformer Martin Schalling, written in Amberg in 1569 and first printed in 1571. It is sung to an anonymous melody, Zahn No. 8326, which appeared in a tablature book for organ in 1577. The hymn is often used for funerals, especially the third and last stanza, "" (Ah Lord, let thine own angels dear). It appears in the current German Protestant hymnal  (EG).

Text

The first theme of the hymn is the love to God and one's neighbour, following the Great Commandment. The final line is "" (I want to praise you for ever!)

Music 

Several composers used the tune, some also the text. chorale preludes were composed by Johann Friedrich Alberti and Bach (BWV 340 and BWV 1115), among others.

Dieterich Buxtehude wrote an extensive cantata (BuxWV 41), probably for a church concert at the Marienkirche in Lübeck, a work regarded as a major Baroque cantata because of its clear architecture and thoughtful interpretation of the text. Johann Ernst Bach composed a sacred cantata.

Johann Sebastian Bach used the hymn in his cantatas and notably to conclude his St John Passion. In 1724, he used stanza 3, "" (Ah Lord, let thine own angels dear), in the first version of the work, and returned to it in the fourth and last version. In , composed in 1726 for St. Michael's Day, he quotes the melody instrumentally in the central tenor aria, played by the trumpet. Alfred Dürr writes that the Leipzig congregation would understand it as an allusion to the third stanza. Bach actually used this stanza to end , written for the same occasion two or three years later. Bach used the first stanza to conclude , written for Pentecost Monday of 1726.

Hugo Distler composed a chorale motet for eight vocal parts a cappella, his Op. 2, which Karl Straube recommended for print as the work of a mature master of polyphony.
"" is part of the current German Protestant hymnal  (EG) under number 397.

References

External links 
 Ach Herr, laß dein lieb Engelein (final stanza, from Bach's St John Passion), by the Netherlands Bach Society

16th-century hymns in German
Lutheran hymns
Hymn tunes